Beaver Municipal Airport  is a public use airport in Beaver County, Utah, United States. It is owned by the city of Beaver and located four nautical miles (5 mi, 7 km) southwest of its central business district. This airport is included in the National Plan of Integrated Airport Systems for 2011–2015, which categorized it as a general aviation facility.

History 
The airport was opened in May 1944.

In 1992, the airport received federal funding to extend and rehabilitate their runway, as well as install a visual approach system.  A fence, to keep both wildlife and unauthorized people out of the airport grounds, was funded in 2007.

Facilities and aircraft 
Beaver Municipal Airport covers an area of 841 acres (340 ha) at an elevation of 5,863 feet (1,787 m) above mean sea level. It has two runways: 13/31 is 4,984 by 75 feet (1,519 x 23 m) with an asphalt surface and 7/25 is 2,150 by 50 feet (655 x 15 m) with a dirt surface.

For the 12-month period ending December 31, 2010, the airport had 1,958 aircraft operations, an average of 163 per month: 97% general aviation and 3% air taxi. At that time there were 9 aircraft based at this airport: 56% single-engine and 44% ultralight.

Instrument approach procedure (IAP): RNAV (GPS)-A

References

External links 
 
 Aerial image as of June 1999 from USGS The National Map
 

Airports in Utah
Transportation in Beaver County, Utah
Buildings and structures in Beaver County, Utah